Mchawa  (Mkhava) is a village in the administrative district of Gmina Baligród, within Lesko County, Subcarpathian Voivodeship, in south-eastern Poland.

The village has a population of 300.

References

Mchawa